WSB (750 kHz) is a commercial AM radio station in Atlanta, Georgia. It airs a news/talk radio format, simulcast on Doraville-licensed WSBB-FM.  WSB is the flagship station for Cox Media Group; in addition to WSB and WSBB-FM, it owns three other Atlanta radio stations and Atlanta's ABC Television Network affiliate, WSB-TV. From 1939 to 2019, WSB was owned by Cox Enterprises along with the Atlanta Journal-Constitution daily newspaper; the station had been established by the Journal in 1922. The station's studios and offices are located at the WSB Television and Radio Group building on West Peachtree Street in Midtown Atlanta, which is shared with its television and radio partners.

WSB transmits with 50,000 watts of nondirectional power, the highest permitted by the Federal Communications Commission (FCC) for commercial AM stations.  WSB is a clear-channel Class A station.  The transmitter and radiating tower are located seven miles (11 kilometers) northeast of Atlanta at the Northlake Tower Festival Shopping Center, off Lavista Road in Tucker, Georgia.  Its daytime coverage area is not as large as 50,000-watt AM stations in other parts of the country due to Georgia's poor ground conductivity; as such, a number of outer Atlanta suburbs (such as Gainesville, Newnan, and Griffin) only receive a grade B signal. Even so, it still provides at least secondary coverage well into the North Georgia mountains, and as far south as Macon.  At night, when radio waves travel farther, WSB can be heard across much of the eastern half of North America with a good radio. However, it is strongest in the Southeast and East Coast.  Although WSB is licensed to make HD Radio digital transmissions, it is not doing so, apparently due to listener complaints of RF interference.

History

WSB was one of the first radio stations in the South. In early 1922, there was a tremendous public interest in the then-new technology of radio broadcasting. On December 1, 1921, the U.S. Department of Commerce, in charge of radio at the time, adopted a regulation formally establishing a broadcasting station category, which set aside the wavelength of 360 meters (833 kHz) for entertainment broadcasts, and 485 meters (619 kHz) for farm market and weather reports. By the end of the year, the number of authorized stations exceeded 500.

In many communities, a race broke out to see who would be the first to get a station on the air.  In Atlanta, the primary contenders were the two major newspapers, the Atlanta Journal and the Atlanta Constitution. The Journal established a makeshift studio on the fifth floor of its building at 7 Forsyth Street. A transmitter had been ordered, but facing a delay, the newspaper arranged for the equipment used by Gordon Heidt for his amateur station to be temporarily installed. A broadcasting license was normally needed before a station could go on the air, but it was arranged to have an initial telegraphed authorization, which was sent by the Department of Commerce on the evening of March 15, 1922.  The station's debut broadcast took place that evening.

The Journal's new station was issued the randomly assigned call sign WSB. Station management would claim the call letters stood for "Welcome South, Brother," even though the Journal did not specifically request those call letters. The Constitution's station, WGM, debuted two days later on March 17. Because it also was transmitting on 360 meters, the two newspapers had to set up a time-sharing agreement allocating broadcast hours. Competition was so fierce between the two that WSB's manager, Lambdin "The Little Colonel" Kay, banned any person who had previously appeared on WGM from broadcasting over WSB.

In September 1922, the Department of Commerce set aside a second entertainment wavelength, 400 meters (750 kHz) for "Class B" stations that had quality equipment and programming. Both WSB and WGM were assigned to this new wavelength. In May 1923, additional "Class B" frequencies were made available, and Atlanta was assigned the use of 700 kHz. Once again, both WSB and WGM were assigned to this new frequency. However, at the end of July, WGM permanently ceased operations, which gave WSB exclusive use of the assignment.

In February 1924, Lambdin Kay called Art Gillham "The Whispering Pianist" while performing on WSB, a name he used in billing on Columbia Records, radio and theatre. Gillham returned to WSB in 1937 for regular programs. In 1927, WSB became an NBC Red Network affiliate. The trademark three-tone NBC chimes were first played in the WSB studios.

In the summer of 1927, WSB began transmitting on 630 kHz. On November 11, 1928, under the provisions of the Federal Radio Commission's General Order 40, WSB was reassigned to a "clear channel" frequency of 740 kHz. WSB was the dominant station nationally on this frequency. In March 1941, as part of the implementation of the North American Regional Broadcasting Agreement (NARBA), WSB moved to 750 kHz, where it has been ever since.

WSB smoothed the way for the radio spread of southern gospel music throughout the region, through regular programming hosted by Charles Davis Tillman. The Shelby Star newspaper, in an issue dated November 1985, wrote that the talented Dan Hornsby, after the national disaster crash of the stock market, found himself working no longer for Columbia Records but for radio stations like WGST, WATL and WCON, along with being the first morning show announcer for WSB in Atlanta. Lambdin Kay called Hornsby "90% of the local talent on WSB."

In 1939, the Journal newspaper and WSB radio station were sold to James Middleton Cox, the founder of what would become Cox Enterprises. Wright Bryan, a WSB news reporter as well as managing editor of the Atlanta Journal, was also a stringer for NBC during World War II. He was the first war correspondent to broadcast an eyewitness account of the D-Day invasion, reporting from London in the early hours of June 6, 1944. Elmo Ellis, who programmed WSB in the 1950s and 1960s, is remembered as an innovator among Southern broadcasters. He provided the on-air editorials for the station, and in the 1960s, consistently supported civil rights.

From 1925 to 1956, WSB radio, along with later co-owned stations WSB-FM and WSB-TV, operated out of the top floor of the Atlanta Biltmore Hotel in Midtown Atlanta. Afterward, the WSB stations were housed in a Colonial-style mansion with its interior specially built for broadcasting, informally known as "White Columns". That location was also in Midtown Atlanta, where Peachtree Street crosses West Peachtree Street near Ansley Park. In 1998, all of the Cox Radio stations located in the Atlanta radio market, as well as WSB-TV, moved into a new "Digital White Columns" on the same property.  The original White Columns was demolished afterward.

In 1948, WSB added a companion FM station, WSB-FM, originally broadcasting on 104.5 MHz. The Atlanta Constitution had also been experimenting with FM radio, putting WCON-FM on the air the year before.  When the two newspapers merged under Cox ownership in 1952, WCON-FM and WSB-FM went silent. WSB-FM returned to the air in 1955 on WCON-FM's dial position, 98.5 FM. While it has the call letters of WSB-FM, the station traces its founding to when WCON-FM first signed on.

During its early years, when few people had FM radio receivers, WSB-FM mostly simulcast the programming on WSB. That included dramas, comedies, news and sports from the NBC Red Network, as well as local shows. As network programming moved from radio to television in the 1950s, WSB-AM-FM moved toward a full service, middle of the road format of popular music, news, sports and information.  By the late 1960s, WSB-FM was separately programmed with a beautiful music, or "easy listening," format.

Also in 1948, WSB-TV first signed on the air on September 29. It originally broadcast on Channel 8. It is the second-oldest TV station south of Washington, D.C., after WTVR-TV in Richmond, Virginia. Just as WSB aired NBC Red Network radio programming, WSB-TV was originally a primary NBC-TV affiliate.  WSB-TV also carried some ABC shows. While Channel 8 was assigned to The Atlanta Journal, Channel 2 was assigned to The Atlanta Constitution, although the Constitution never got its TV station on the air.  After the two newspapers came under Cox ownership, WSB-TV moved to Channel 2. The station switched networks with WXIA-TV in 1980 to become an ABC affiliate.

WSB formerly broadcast in AM stereo using the Motorola C-QUAM system during the 1980s, a period when music could still be heard on the station. The on-air talent in this era included morning hosts Russ Spooner and Dick Hemby, playing "middle of the road" music, and longtime Atlanta Braves baseball announcer Skip Caray presenting morning sportscasts. As WSB's format progressed to a full-time news/talk radio format by 1987, the AM stereo system was turned off, as it was superfluous since music had been discontinued.

Also in the 1980s, WSB discontinued its NBC affiliation.  Its own news staff delivered all the newscasts, with sound and actualities supplied by AP Radio. In 2018, WSB affiliated with ABC News Radio for its world and national news coverage (co-owned WSB-TV has been an ABC television affiliate since 1980); in 2020, the station switched to CBS News Radio.

On August 16, 2010, WSB began a full-time simulcast on co-owned WBTS 95.5 FM, which previously played rhythmic contemporary music under the branding "95.5 The Beat". That October 1, WBTS's call letters were changed to WSBB-FM; the extra "B" was added to the FM call letters because Cox already owns a station with the WSB-FM call sign on 98.5. On July 31, 2019, WSB and WSBB-FM began calling themselves "95.5 WSB".  The AM frequency and FM callsign are only mentioned occasionally, such as during the hourly FCC-mandated station identification.

Cox Enterprises sold majority control of Cox Media Group to Apollo Global Management on December 17, 2019. While Cox Enterprises retains a minority stake in the company, the sale effectively separated the WSB stations from the Atlanta Journal-Constitution, which remains wholly owned by Cox Enterprises.

Award
WSB won a 1946 Special Citation of Honor Peabody Award for its program "The Harbor We Seek".

Sports
WSB has long served as the flagship radio station for the University of Georgia Bulldogs Radio Network, carrying its football and basketball games.  In past years, WSB also served as the flagship station for Atlanta Braves Major League Baseball, Atlanta Falcons NFL Football and Atlanta Hawks NBA basketball.  WSB carried Braves baseball coverage from 1966, the year the Milwaukee Braves moved to Atlanta, until 1991.  Braves games moved to 640 WGST from 1992 until 1994.

In 1995, the team returned to WSB, the season in which the Braves won the World Series. That same year, Atlanta Hawks game coverage was also picked up by the station. From 1995 until 2004, WSB branded itself as the "Sports Voice of the South," carrying play-by-play game coverage of Braves baseball, Hawks basketball and UGA football and basketball. In 2019, Braves baseball moved to WCNN.

See also

 List of radio stations in Georgia (U.S. state)

References

Bibliography
 "Special Collections and Archives: WSB Radio History" Georgia State University Library Research Guide

External links

WSB (AM) station information (fccdata.org)
WSB Radio Log Books from the Digital Library of Georgia (usg.edu)
FCC History Cards for WSB (covering 1922-1981)

Cox Media Group
News and talk radio stations in the United States
Radio stations established in 1922
SB (AM)
1922 establishments in Georgia (U.S. state)
Clear-channel radio stations
Radio stations licensed before 1923 and still broadcasting